Alacranes Musical (English: "Musical Scorpions") are a Regional Mexican band that specialize in the  Duranguense subgenre.  They are from the Chicago, Illinois suburb of Aurora.

Recordings
The band has released several albums since its formation in November 1999, and in 2007 was nominated for a Latin Grammy for their album, Ahora Y Siempre.  Their hits "Si Yo Fuera Tu Amor" and "Por Tu Amor" reached #2 and #4, respectively, on Billboard's Latin Regional Mexican Airplay chart. Their single "Por Amarte Así," a cover of Cristian Castro's song, has topped the Billboard charts at number one for several weeks in a row. According to Billboard, "Por Amarte Así" has also been the number-one downloaded ringtone.

Split
There were two Alacranes Musical touring due to arguments between the members of the group, Memo Ibarra and Omar Sanchez, and the musicians of the group, the Urbina Family. They parted ways and the record company that claims to own rights to the name of the group sided with the singers. The Urbina Family hired former singer Sergio "Hersheys" Federico and former Banda Lamento Show singer Alonzo Andez to sing for their group. The singers hired all new musicians. Fans seemed to be 50-50 on the situation, many liking the originals—the Urbina Family—and many liking the singers. Both have recorded material under the name. In February 2011, the Urbinas posted a YouTube video declaring that the dispute was settled and that their group would be the official Alacranes Musical as of Easter weekend that year. A new album has also been announced for 2011. The other half of the group changed its name to Alerta Zero.

Discography
1999 Pa’Que Son Pasiones

2000 Famoso Durango

2001 Rancheras De Corazón

2002 Puro Tamborazo Alacranero

2002 Con Fuerza Alacranera

2003 Furia Alacranera

2004 ¿A Cambio De Que?

2004 15 Polkas Alacraneras

2005 Nuestra Historia Y Algo Mas... 

2005 100% Originales 

2006 A Paso Firme 

2006 Puros Corridos Venenosos 

2007 Ahora Y Siempre

2008 Tu Inspiración 

2009 Live En Vivo Desde Mexico

2010 Por Siempre Alacranes

2011 Besos De Fuego

2013 Nuestra Historia De Voces

2014 De Corazón Ranchero 

2016 Una Nueva Era

2017 Llegamos Pa’ Quedarnos

2020 El Reencuentro

2021 Juntos Mejor 

Singles

2007 Por Amarte Así

2008 Dame Tu Amor

2011 Besos De Fuego

2013 Tu No Tienes La Culpa

2013 La Suerte Viene A Buscarme

2014 Perdidos ft. Vicky Terrazas De Los Horóscopos De Durango 

2015 Es Tan Perfecta

2015 Amor Que Nace

2016 Te Va Gustar

2016 Las Mañanitas 

2017 El Zapateado Encabronado #5

2017 La Media Vuelta

2018 Según Por Mi Culpa

2018 Un Poco De Amor

2019 Navidad Sin Ti

2020 Muérdete La Lengua (ft. La Zenda Norteña)

2021 Me Vas A Extrañar (ft. Los Horóscopos De Durango)

2021 Borracho De Amor 

2021 Una En Un Millón (ft. La Zenda Norteña)

2021 Poemas Disparejos 

2022 Solo Me Quiero Enamorar

2022 Ya Acabó

2022 Ando Bien Contento

2022 Tigres Mix

The Reconcile begins in December 2019 with the two original singers for the band Guillermo 'Memo" Ibarra And Sergio "Hershey" Federico Rejoin the group and begin the 2020-2021 "EL Reencuentro" Tour All Over the US.

References

American duranguense musicians
Fonovisa Records artists
Musical groups from Chicago
Latin Grammy Award winners
Universal Music Latin Entertainment artists
Duranguense music groups